Herschel Eldon Daugherty (October 27, 1910 – March 5, 1993) was an American television and film director and occasional actor.

Early life and career
Born in Clarks Hill, Indiana, to Charles Emerson and Blanche Eracene Daugherty (né Feerer), Daugherty graduated from Whittier College in 1934 and was awarded a scholarship to the Pasadena Playhouse School of the Theater, where he later served as one of its associate directors.
In 1942, Daugherty was signed by Warner Brothers as a dialogue director, in which capacity he served for roughly a decade before moving to TV as a full-fledged director. During that period, he also had a number of small acting roles, most of them uncredited. Speaking in 1979, he recalled, "I was in front of a camera just long enough to know I'd do best behind it. It's much easier to tell people what to do." Daugherty's own difficulties onscreen informed his approach to directing:
I like to think I was a coach. Something like Knute Rockne. I want to make it possible for actors to play over their heads, to desire to be better than ever before. I want to give them faith in themselves, to believe in themselves. [...] I never figured there was any point in being like DeMille or some of the others. I watched him tear a young actress apart one day. He had already destroyed her, but he kept going on and on. I realized then there's no way you can act when someone's yelling at you. I was determined that wasn't going to be my approach.

As to just what that approach was and how it differed from DeMille, some comments made in November 1956 by Piper Laurie, then a soon-to-be 25-year-old, studio-promoted starlet—struggling to break free from that image and fresh on the heels of co-starring in a film under Daugherty's direction—may be helpful.
I'm not the most experienced actress in the world. I would like to be, and I found more attention given to my acting on "The Road That Led Afar" than in most of the pictures I've played. [...] In this role the directors have given me a sense of freedom in acting for the first time in my life.

Regarding director Jean Negulesco, with whom he worked at both Warner Brothers and 20th Century Fox, Daugherty recalled:Negulesco was a great artist, but he couldn't care less about acting. He let me handle all the actors and let me rehearse all the scenes. He told me, "You can do all the work so long as you give me the credit."

Actor Dale Robertson, who would work with both Daugherty and Negulesco on Take Care of My Little Girl (1951), is less charitable in his assessment of the film's nominal director:
Jean Negulesco was an overrated director. He had a dialogue coach who went on to become a really good director... Herschel Daugherty. [...] And Herschel was actually the one who was doing the directing, you know, and Negulesco was taking all the credit. [...] [Y]ou'd see him go over and whisper in Negulesco's ear. And then pretty soon, in a very loud voice, Negulesco would say, "I don't like this line. We're going to make it this way." And he says, "Now that makes more sense. Yes, we'll do it that way." But I never heard him come up with an original thought. It was always Herschel.

Daugherty went on to direct various episodes of popular television shows such as Gunsmoke (1955), Alfred Hitchcock Presents (1955), Crusader (1955), and Wagon Train, Rawhide (1959), Bonanza (1959), Thriller (1961–62), The Man from U.N.C.L.E. (1964), Star Trek (1966), The Time Tunnel (1966), Hawaii Five-O (1968), The Smith Family (1971–72), Emergency! (1972) and The Six Million Dollar Man (1974).  In 1957, for his work on General Electric Theater's "The Road That Led Afar", Daugherty, along with assistant director Richard Birnie, won the Directors Guild of America Award; they also received an Emmy nomination, in the category of "Best Direction, Half Hour or Less." Two years later, Daugherty was nominated in essentially the same category (albeit a slightly more inclusive version), "Best Direction of a Single Program of a Dramatic Series (Less Than One Hour)," for GE Theatre's critically acclaimed adaptation of James Thurber's short story, "One is a Wanderer." In addition, Daugherty directed Millard Lampell's "No Hiding Place," one of the most impactful episodes of the much-praised but short-lived CBS series East Side/West/Side (1963–1964).

At least three notable screen debuts were made with Daugherty directing: Carol Lynley—in the 1958 Disney-produced semi-historical western, The Light in the Forest—as well as Gene Kelly and Gloria Grahame making their respective TV acting debuts. Kelly starred in the 1957 Schlitz Playhouse of the Stars adaptation of Flannery O'Connor's short story, "The Life You Save May Be Your Own," while Grahame and co-star Dick Shawn helped General Electric Theater ring in 1961 with the episode, "Don't Let it Throw You."

Daugherty's dialogue director credits include, among others, the 1947 psychological drama Possessed, such films noir as Passage to Marseille (1944), The Mask of Dimitrios (1944) and Mildred Pierce (1945), the well-received stage-to-screen adaptation Life with Father (1947), the 1946 musical biopic Night and Day and the 1949 musical comedy/Tinseltown parody It's a Great Feeling (1949).

Daugherty died on March 5, 1993, in Encinitas, California at the age of 82.

Filmography

Films

Television

Notes

References

Further reading

Articles
 "Covina Notes". The Pasadena Post. April 30, 1926. p. 5.
 "College Gridders Are Given 1931 Awards". The Whittier News. February 6, 1931. p. 9.
 "Covinian's Dramatic Skit to Be Feature of College Concert". The Pomona Progress Bulletin. March 16, 1932. p. 5.
 "Seniors Begin Final Week of College Life". The Whittier News. May 23, 1932. p. 1.
 "Whittier Gleemen in School Program". The Whittier News. April 7, 1933. p. 4. 
 "New Drama Is Shown at Little Theater". San Bernardino Sun. August 23, 1934. p. 10.
 "Daugherty Graduates from Theater School". Covina Argus. June 28, 1935. p. 9. 
 Von Blom, Katherine (June 24, 1942). "Comedy of 1900's Breezy". The Los Angeles Times. p. 36.
 Bernstein, Bob (June 10, 1957). "G. E. Theatre—Net". The Billboard. p. 14.
 "Pasadena Playhouse Award to Holliman, Daugherty". The Hollywood Reporter. June 10, 1957. p. 2.
 "Staff of Outstanding Motion Picture Directors Assigned to Two Units Producing 20 Filmed TV 'Crisis' Dramas". NBC Press Release. June 25, 1957.
 "The Light in the Forest (Color)". Variety. April 30, 1958. p. 6.
 Dowling, Maxine (July 11, 1958). "Disney at Normandie—And It's a Dandy". New York Daily News. p. 53.
 Grant, Hank (December 5, 1958). "TV Review: The Sakae Ito Story". The Hollywood Reporter. p. 6.
 Starr, Eve (September 15, 1960). "Inside TV: What's On the Agenda". The Allentown Morning Call. p. 36.
 "Boris Karloff to Star in 'Thriller' Drama". NBC. July 27, 1961.
 "'Thriller' Starts New Season in Moday GTime Spot Sept. 18 with 'Masquerade,' Humorous Suspense Drama Starring Elizabeth Montgomery, Tom Poston, John Carradine". NBC. August 15, 1961.
 Nolan, Jack Edmund (April 1968). "Films on TV". Films in Review. p. 168.
 Browning, Norma Lee (January 17, 1971). "Hollywood Today: Fonda Has No Worries About Series". Chicago Tribune. p. 352.
 Nolan, Jack Edmund (February 1972). "Letters: Janes P. Cavanagh". Films in Review. p. 125.
 "Award Shorts". Broadcasting-Telecasting. February 18, 1979. p. 95.
 Weaver, Tom (March 1998). "Secret Agent Scribe". Starlog Magazine. p. 79.
 Garcia, Frank; Phillips, Mark (2012). "The Guests of 'Trek': 'Star Trek' 's Abraham Lincoln". Starlog Magazine. p. 61.

Books
 Wicking, Christopher; Vahimagi, Tise (1979) The American Vein.  London: Talisman Books. pp. 157–158. .
 Ream, Donald; Ream, Lynne (1992). Clarks Hill: A Pictorial History of Clarks Hill and its Surrounding Area. Lafayette, IN: D. and L. Ream. pp. 348–365. .
 Roberts, Jerry (2009). Encyclopedia of Television Film Directors, Volume 1. Lanham, MD: Scarecrow Press. p. 117. .
 Robertson, Susan (2019). Bucking Hollywood. Connealt Lake, PA: Page Publishing. .

External links

1910 births
1993 deaths
American male film actors
American television directors
Film directors from Indiana
People from Tippecanoe County, Indiana
20th-century American male actors